Captain Lewis Cunningham Broadus (1877–1961) was a Buffalo Soldier born in Henrico County, Virginia, who served his country with distinction in the 25th Infantry Regiment and the 92nd Division of the United States Army. He served from 1897 to 1923, and was a veteran of the Indian Wars, Spanish–American War, Philippine–American War, Border War, and World War I.

He began his military career as a Private in Company D, 25th Infantry Regiment. Over the course of many military campaigns and special assignments, Lewis rose to the ranks of regimental-Sergeant Major, and Ordnance Sergeant. With the outbreak of World War I, and after many petitions and commendations, he attend officer training and was successfully commissioned as a Captain in 1917.

Lewis was awarded a Certificate of Merit for "coolness, presence of mind, and bravery in saving lives of others at Fort Niobrara," by President Theodore Roosevelt in 1906. After the Certificate of Merit Medal was declared obsolete in 1918, his medal was first exchanged for the newly established Distinguished Service Medal, and, after a change in award regulations by Congress in 1934, converted into the Distinguished Service Cross.

Background and personal life
Born on July 24, 1877, in Richmond, Virginia, he was the son of an Irish slave owner, Louis Cunningham, and an enslaved African woman, who today is known only as Lizzie. He appears in the U.S. Census dated June 3, 1880, Henrico County, Virginia, as Louis Cunningham, age three. After the untimely death of his mother, he was raised by the Broadus family, listed in the census as "Arthur- stable hand", his son "David- tobacco hand", and daughter "Mary- washerwoman". He later changed his name to Lewis Broadus.

While stationed at Fort Custer, Montana, he met and married Florence Blackwood, a young Native American woman of the Lakota (Sioux) born of the Burnt Thigh Tiyóšpaye Band, which was later named the Rosebud Sioux, during the time period when the Dakota Territory became the State of South Dakota. After marrying, Lewis decided to make the U.S. Army his career, which involved frequent postings to many different areas of the country. Postings required many adjustments to new communities such as new local military schools and new neighborhoods for his young family, which then consisted of Lewis, Florence, daughter Mabel, and son Ernest. After the death of his first wife, Florence, Lewis remarried in 1931. He and his second wife Edith McClenny had a daughter, Elizabeth.

Military career
After the end of the Civil War and just eight years before his birth, the U.S. Army had established four African American regiments which became the 24th and the 25th Infantry, and the 9th and the 10th Cavalry. At age twenty, on January 20, 1897, he enlisted as a young volunteer in the 25th Infantry and was sent to Fort Custer, Montana. Shortly after, he was sent to fight in America's first overseas conflict, the Spanish American War.

Spanish–American War
Since 1885, Cuba had been fighting for independence from Spain. In 1898, when the battleship USS Maine exploded in Havana Harbor, American troops were mobilized for war. The African American regiments of the 24th and 25th Infantry and 9th and 10th Cavalry were in the forefront of the fighting. Lewis Broadus saw action at the Battle of El Caney. The following excerpt is an eyewitness account of charging the blockhouse at El Caney:

African American troops bravely served their country, but the U.S. War Department refused to promote African American men as commissioned officers. Lewis nonetheless requested promotion as he had distinguished himself by recovering the horses of the mounted officers at great personal risk, and also saved the lives of four men of the regiment. In a letter to Captain W.S. Scott, Company G, 25th Infantry, Fort McIntosh, Texas, dated September 4, 1899, he wrote the following:

Philippine-American War
Following the surrender of Spain and ceding of Puerto Rico, Guam, and the Philippines to the United States, Filipino nationalists (Insurectos) began launching attacks against the American forces. Lewis reported to the Presidio, which was then a military training base located on the tip of the San Francisco Peninsula, while on the way to the Philippines in early 1899. Upon arrival in the pacific on August 1, the 25th regiment was stationed on Mindanao, the second-largest island of the archipelago, and engaged in numerous skirmishes. Lewis was recommended for a commission as a Lieutenant to serve with the Philippine Scouts but was denied.

Indian Wars & Certificate of Merit Action
Upon the regiment's return to the U.S. in 1902, he was sent back to the frontier to once again serve as a Buffalo Soldier, patrolling and defending what was called the "Indian Territories"—the Western Plains region. An incident occurred while he served as 1st Sergeant at Fort Niobrara, Nebraska on July 3, 1906. A memorandum from the Acting Secretary of the U.S. War Department, Office of the Chief of Staff, Washington dated September 1906 states:

He was awarded the Certificate of Merit Medal on Sept. 25, 1906, by President Theodore Roosevelt.

Border War & Interwar Service
During the Border War, Broadus was sent to fight Mexican revolutionaries in skirmishes on the Texas–Mexican border. Later, between 1913 to 1917, the 25th Infantry Regiment was sent to Oahu, Hawaii where approximately 800 African American soldiers were housed in the Schofield Barracks.

During 1917, he was assigned to special duty in Hartford, Connecticut where he served in the capacity of Ordnance Sergeant, a staff non commissioned officer, receiving and issuing all ordnance, (artillery, weapons, ammunition) "assisting the Property and Disbursing Officer for the State of Connecticut, per Special Orders #281 C.D. of Long Island Sound, Fort H.G. Wright, N.Y." Once again, he petitioned for appointment as "Commissioned Officer in the Colored Regiments" citing his exemplary service record:

Enlisted Jan. 20, 1897
Appointed Corporal and Sergeant Sept 25, 1898 Company D 25th Infantry
Promoted to 1st Sergeant July 26, 1900.
Served in Company D 25th Infantry to Feb 26, 1901
Transferred to Company M
Appointed Corporal Sergeant and 1st Sergeant Company M 25th Infantry
Served in Company M to May 19, 1912
Battalion Sergeant Major 25th Infantry to May 2, 1914
Ordnance Sergeant US Army from May 2, 1914 to 1917.
Awarded Certificate of Merit
Qualified as Expert Rifleman 1904, 05, 06, 07, 1910, 1912 and 1914.
Qualified as Expert Pistol Shot 1910, 1911, 1912, and 1913

Feature in The Crisis Magazine

As W.E.B. DuBois had founded The Crisis Magazine in 1910—the official publication of the National Association for the Advancement of Colored People, the June 1917 issue featured Broadus as one of four "outstanding men of the month." His photograph shows him in formal military dress wearing the insignia of Regimental Sergeant Major on his left arm, black and gold service stripes above his wrists, ornamental braided cord across his chest, and over twenty medals from shoulder to waist. 
His feature in the magazine reads:

World War I
As the United States entered World War I, the military experienced a rapid buildup, including the addition of over 350,000 colored recruits and draftees, and required additional colored officers to train the draftees, as well as lead them in the field.

Lewis took this opportunity to once again petition for promotion as Commissioned Officer and received another commendation. The letter was in support of sending him to, "the Reserves Officers Training Camp at Fort Des Moines, Iowa for the term of his instruction commencing June 18, 1917 … [as] he is in a high degree the type of a soldier desired there." After completing training with the Seventeenth Provisional Training Regiment at Fort Des Moines, Broadus received his commission as a Captain on October 15, 1917. He was subsequently assigned duty at Camp Funston.

For the duration of the war, Lewis commanded a Military Police unit within the 317th Train Headquarters and Military Police, 92nd Division. Upon arrival in France and direct deployment of the division, the unit's primary mission was "to provide battlefield circulation control to support the division's move into the Marbache sector near Pont a Mousson," which entailed operating traffic control points, and evacuating and managing enemy prisoners of war. This mission was notably achieved with great efficiency that enabled the division to advance without a break in momentum.

After the war, the 92nd Division was dissolved, and Lewis continued his service in the military police, once again with the 25th Infantry Regiment.

Retirement and legacy

After his military career ended, Lewis settled in the town of Mount Vernon, New York where he worked as Special Officer for the Mount Vernon police department and was employed by the Alcohol Tax Division of NYC until his retirement in 1947. By 1961, he had served his country for 26 years with "impeccable military and combat credentials" and was one of the last remaining Spanish–American War veterans. He died at age 83 in Veterans Hospital in Jamaica, NY and had a military burial in Long Island National Cemetery, Farmingdale, Long Island.
The Certificate of Merit Medal that he was awarded as a young man in 1906 by President Roosevelt had been converted to the Distinguished Service Medal in 1919. By the "Act of Congress approval March 5, 1934, authorization of the U.S. War Department," the Distinguished Service Medal was converted into the Distinguished Service Cross. This award was sent to his surviving family, who presented it as a gift to the Smithsonian National Museum of African American History and Culture in Washington, D.C. and accepted by the Museum's Curator of Collections His military papers were donated to the Library of Virginia Foundation, on behalf of the Library of Virginia.

Citation

In 2007, his medal was donated by his family to the Smithsonian National Museum of African American History and Culture, Washington, D.C., where it is included in its permanent collection and special exhibitions.

Awards and decorations

 Expert Rifleman (1904, 1905, 1906, 1907, 1910, 1912, 1914)
 Expert Pistol Shot (1910, 1911, 1912, 1913)

Additional Images

References

1877 births
1961 deaths
People from Henrico County, Virginia
Buffalo Soldiers
American military personnel of the Spanish–American War
American military personnel of the Philippine–American War
United States Army officers
United States Army personnel of World War I